Agudos is a Brazilian municipality located in the west-central part of the state of São Paulo. The population is 37,401 (2020 est.) in an area of 966 km².  Distance from the capital is 330 km and is accessed by the Rodovia Marechal Rondon. The municipality was established in 1898, when it was separated from Lençóis.

Geography

Limits

Bauru
Lençóis Paulista 
Pederneiras 
Borebi 
Piratininga 
Cabrália Paulista 
Paulistânia

Economy
Agudos; economy is an agricultural municipality and have some industries of national prominence as Duratex and the Ambev.  The municipal agricultural production is made up of:  
Pineapples
Sugar cane
Cassava
Corn
Orange
Lemon
Tangerina
The Duratex industry possesses extensive reserves in the city that are managed by the Duraflora.  The cattle of Agudos has about 70,000 cows, 10,000 swines and 300,000 chickens.

References

External links
  Agudos website

Municipalities in São Paulo (state)
Populated places established in 1898
1898 establishments in Brazil